Veronica Fish is an American comic book artist and painter best known for her work with Marvel Comics and Archie Comics.

Early life
Veronica Fish attended the School of Visual Arts in New York City for two years and received a BFA from the Massachusetts College of Art and Design in Boston. Her style has been described as "ultra-expressive and playful."

Career
Fish teaches at the Worcester Art Museum and designed the Museum's mascot "Helmutt the Dog."

Her paintings have been exhibited in Los Angeles, Boston, New York and London.

In 2015 Fish took over regular artist duties on the rebooted Archie comic book series. She also created the initial concept art for The CW TV show Riverdale, based on the Archie comics.

In 2016 Fish was announced as the artist on Boom! Studios roller skating comic SLAM.

Personal life
Fish lives in Worcester, Massachusetts and is married to fellow artist Andy Fish.

Bibliography
Veronica Fish's comic and graphic novel work include:

Marvel Comics
Spider-Woman (2015-) #10 - 17, with writer Dennis Hopeless
Spider-Woman: Shifting Gears Vol 3: Scare Tactics trade paperback, with writer Dennis Hopeless
Spider-Gwen Annual 2016, with writer Jason Latour
Silk (2015-) #4 - 5, with writer (writer)
Howard The Duck (2015-) #2, with writer Chip Zdarsky

Archie Comics
Archie, Vol. 1, by Mark Waid, Fiona Staples (illustrations), Annie Wu (illustrator), Veronica Fish (illustrator) 
Archie, Vol. 2, with writer Mark Waid
Archie (2015-) #5 - 10, with writer Mark Waid. 
Betty & Veronica #1, Variant cover.

Boom! Studios
Over the Garden Wall #1, Variant cover.
Adventure Time #54, Variant cover.
Goldie Vance #2, Variant cover.
Clarence Quest #1, Cover
SLAM!, with writer Pamela Ribon

Other publishers
Geeks & Greeks graphic novel (Relentless Goat Productions, 2016), with writer Steve Altes
Pirates of Mars, Volume 2: Gods + Monsters (2015)
Challenger #1-3 (2014), by Kristopher Waddell
Dracula: The Dead Travel Fast (McFarland Press, 2013)
Pirates of Mars, Volume 1: Love + Revenge (2009)

Notes

External links

1985 births
American female comics artists
American graphic novelists
Living people